Lomelosia caucasica, the Caucasian pincushion flower, pincushion-flower or Caucasian scabious, is a species of flowering plant in the family Caprifoliaceae, native to the Caucasus, north eastern Turkey, and northern Iran. Pincushion-shaped buds, borne on erect hairy, stems, open to pale blue or lavender flower heads,  in diameter, from late summer through to autumn.

It was formerly known as Scabiosa caucasica until 1985, when it became Lomelosia caucasica. It is still listed in some sources as Scabiosa caucasica.

Taxonomy
After a study of the family Dipsacaceae (by Verlaque 1983), the Scabioseae were then split into several genera, with S. caucasica placed in Lomelosia  (Greuter 1985). Further carpological (study of fruit and seeds) and palynological (dust study) studies (Mayer & Ehrendorf er 1999) have further confirmed this view, which has then been further substantiated by more recent data from molecular phylogenetics (Caputo & al. 2004; Avino & al. 2009).

The GBIF, and United States Department of Agriculture and the Agricultural Research Service, agreed to the name change.

Ecology
The plant is highly attractive to bees and other pollinating insects.

Cultivars
Numerous cultivars have been developed for garden use, in shades of red, purple, pink, blue and white. The cultivars of 'Clive Greaves', (large, lavender blue), and 'Miss Willmott', (white with tall stems) have gained the Royal Horticultural Society's Award of Garden Merit.

Other cultivars include:-

'Blue Perfection' (blue)
'Bressingham White' (white)
'Claire Greaves' (lavender blue)
'Compliment' (large blue)
'Fama' (large lavender blue)
'Floral Queen' (light blue)
'Loddon White' (white)
'Moonbeam Blue' (dark blue)
'Mrs Isaac House' (creamy white)
'Perfecta' (dark lavender blue)
'Perfecta Alba Blanc' (white)
'Staefa' (blue)

References

Other sources
 Botanica, Einjährige und mehrjährige Pflanzen, Über 2000 Pflanzenporträts, paĝe 790 (German)

Caprifoliaceae